Egila is a genus of small sea snails, marine gastropod mollusks in the family Pyramidellidae, the pyrams and their allies.

This genus was previously placed in the tribe Chrysallidini of the family Odostomiidae. It has both extant and fossil (Cenozoic) members.

Life habits
Little is known about the biology of the members of this genus. As is true of most members of the Pyramidellidae sensu lato, they are most likely to be ectoparasites.

Species
Species within the genus Egila include:
 † Egila arcuata Laws, 1941
 Egila australis Laseron, 1959
 Egila curtisensis Laseron, 1959
 Egila ektopa Pimenta & Absalão, 2004
 Egila lacunata (Carpenter, 1857) - type species, as Odostomia (Parthenia) lacunata
 Egila poppei (Dall & Bartsch, 1909)
 Egila univestis Laseron, 1959
 Egila virginiae van Regteren Altena, 1975
Species brought into synonymy
 Egila articulata (Hedley, 1909) : synonym of Besla articulata (Hedley, 1909)
 Egila mayii' (Tate, 1898): synonym of Chrysallida mayii (Tate, 1898)
 Egila spiralis Laseron, 1959 : synonym of Chrysallida spiralis (Laseron, 1959)
 Egila typica Laseron, 1959 : synonym of Parthenina typica (Laseron, 1959) (original combination)

The species of Egila'' from Brazil have been reviewed by Piementa & Absalão (2004).

References

 Robba E. (2013) Tertiary and Quaternary fossil pyramidelloidean gastropods of Indonesia. Scripta Geologica 144: 1-191

Pyramidellidae